Badelbu (also Romanized as Badelbū) is a village in Nazluchay Rural District, Nazlu District, Urmia County, West Azerbaijan Province, Iran. At the 2006 census, its population was 328, in 74 families.

References 

Populated places in Urmia County